Lewis Frederick Barber (11 April 1906 – 1983) was an English footballer who played in the Football League for Halifax Town and Manchester City.

References

1906 births
1983 deaths
English footballers
Association football goalkeepers
English Football League players
Halifax Town A.F.C. players
Manchester City F.C. players